The Imperial edict of declaration of war by the Empire of Japan on the United States and the British Empire (米國及英國ニ對スル宣戰ノ詔書) was published on December 8, 1941 (Japan time; December 7 in the United States), 7.5 hours after Japanese forces started an attack on the United States naval base at Pearl Harbor and attacks on British forces in Malaya, Singapore, and Hong Kong. The declaration of war was printed on the front page of all Japanese newspapers' evening editions on December 8. The document was subsequently printed again on the eighth day of each month throughout the war (until Japan surrendered in 1945), to re-affirm the resolve for the war.

Text of the document

Below is the text to the declaration of the war with the boldened texts released in the name of the Emperor of Japan:

Historical context 

The document declares the war against the United States and British Empire, discusses their presumed disruptive actions against Japan's foreign policy and states that all avenues for averting war have been exhausted from the Government of Japan. Japan had invaded much of East Asia to create what they called the "Greater East Asia Co-Prosperity Sphere", now largely viewed as a pretext for imperialism. In response, the US imposed an oil embargo on Japan in August 1941 to stop aiding their aggression in Asia and to contain Japanese actions. There was also an embargo on steel. Japan saw this as a hostile and provocative act, and retaliated with the bombing of Pearl Harbor and the declarations of war on the US and the British Empire.

See also

 Arcadia Conference
Declarations of war during World War II
 Diplomatic history of World War II
Hull note
 Kellogg–Briand Pact
United Kingdom declaration of war on Japan
 United States declaration of war on Japan
 大東亜戦争
 大詔を拝し奉りて

References

External links 
 Declaration of war by the Empire of Japan on the United States and British Empire
Japan's declaration of war, Hansard, 8 December 1941 (records of debate in the British Houses of Parliament)

Declarations of war during World War II
Japan–United Kingdom military relations
Japan–United States military relations
1941 in international relations
1941 in Japan
1941 in the United Kingdom
1941 in the United States
1941 in military history
1941 in the British Empire
British Empire in World War II
December 1941 events
Axis powers
1941 documents